Lučenec District (okres Lučenec) is a district in the Banská Bystrica Region of south-central Slovakia. Until 1918, most of the district belong to the Novohrad county, with a small area around the villages of Šíd, Čamovce and Šurice in the east belonging to the Gemer a Malohont county.

The district is situated in the Southern Slovak Basin, in the broad valley of the Ipeľ River.
The two towns—Lučenec and Fiľakovo—comprise nearly 54% of the population of the district, the remainder living in the 55 surrounding villages.

The district lies on the E571 route (Route 50 in Slovak numbering) from Bratislava to Košice, and on one of the train lines connecting the two cities. Train services also run to Budapest via Fiľakovo. There is a small aerodrome at Boľkovce.

The main industries are food processing and building materials.

Municipalities

Sources 
Lučenec—ideal place for investment, published by Lučenec Town Council, Novohradská 1, 98401 Lučenec (Slovakia).

References

External links 
 Official site

Districts of Slovakia
Geography of Banská Bystrica Region